The Circaea, or enchanter's nightshades, are a genus of flowering plants in the evening primrose family Onagraceae. About two dozen taxa have been described, including eight species. Plants of the genus occur throughout the temperate and boreal forests of the Northern Hemisphere. Three taxa occur in North America: Circaea alpina, Circaea canadensis, and the hybrid Circaea × sterilis. The generic name Circaea refers to the enchantress Circe from Greek mythology who is said to have used the herb as a charm.

Description

Members of genus Circaea are perennial, herbaceous plants with erect stems, which may or may not be branched. The stem leaves are opposite and petiolate, with toothed edges (i.e., with dentate leaf margins). The inflorescence is a terminal, erect raceme, with additional racemes at the apices of stem branches (if any). Flowers are dimerous with 2 sepals, 2 petals, and 2 stamens. The sepals, petals, and stamens alternate such that the stamens ultimately align with the sepals. The petals are white or pink in color. The fruit is a capsule with one or two seeds. Plants disperse their seeds by producing burrs that adhere to clothing, fur, and feathers.

Taxonomy

In 1753, Swedish botanist Carl Linnaeus established the genus Circaea by describing two species, Circaea lutetiana and Circaea alpina. Linnaeus also described a variety of C. lutetiana, which later became known as Circaea canadensis.

The generic name Circaea refers to the enchantress Circe from Greek mythology. Botanists in the late 16th century believed Circe used the herb to charm Odysseus' companions, hence the common name enchanter's nightshade (not to be confused with the nightshade family of plants, which are unrelated). Molecular evidence indicates the closest relative to Circaea is the lineage that gave rise to the genus Fuchsia, which diverged from it around 41 million years ago.

Taxa

, Plants of the World Online (POWO) accepts eight species and eight subspecies:

 Circaea alpina 
 Circaea alpina subsp. alpina
 Circaea alpina subsp. angustifolia 
 Circaea alpina subsp. caulescens 
 Circaea alpina subsp. imaicola 
 Circaea alpina subsp. micrantha 
 Circaea alpina subsp. pacifica 
 Circaea canadensis 
 Circaea canadensis subsp. canadensis
 Circaea canadensis subsp. quadrisulcata 
 Circaea cordata 
 Circaea erubescens 
 Circaea glabrescens 
 Circaea lutetiana 
 Circaea mollis 
 Circaea repens 

POWO also recognizes eight named hybrids:

 Circaea × decipiens 
 Circaea × dubia 
 Circaea × intermedia 
 Circaea × mentiens 
 Circaea × ovata 
 Circaea × skvortsovii 
 Circaea × sterilis 
 Circaea × taronensis 

For example, the parents of Circaea × sterilis are C. alpina and C. canadensis. The hybrid is sterile but spreads vigorously by vegetative means.

Distribution

Members of genus Circaea occur throughout the temperate and boreal forests of the Northern Hemisphere, from near sea level to  altitude, and from 10°–70° N latitude. Circaea alpina is the most widespread species, ranging across North America, Europe, and Asia. Likewise Circaea canadensis ranges across continents, in North America, European Russia, and Asia. Circaea lutetiana occurs throughout Europe, ranging eastward to Iran.

Three taxa are known to occur in North America: Circaea alpina, Circaea canadensis, and the hybrid Circaea × sterilis. C. alpina is wide ranging across the continent, from California to Alaska in the west, and from Newfoundland to North Carolina in the east, while C. canadensis is confined to the eastern half of North America. The hybrid, C. × sterilis, is found wherever the ranges of its parent species overlap.

References

External links

 Natural England.  Accessed July 2011
 English Country Garden  Accessed July 2011
 Plant Identification  UK Accessed July 2011
 
 

Taxa named by Joseph Pitton de Tournefort
Plants described in 1753
Taxa named by Carl Linnaeus
Onagraceae genera